Hostettler is a surname. Notable people with the surname include:

Irene Hostettler, Swiss cyclist
John Hostettler (born 1961), American politician
John Hostettler (1925–2018), English writer
Matt Hostettler (born 1986), American politician

See also
 Hostetler